The Outwords Archive (OUTWORDS) is a nonprofit organization based in Los Angeles.  It records and archives on-camera interviews with elders from the LGBTQ+ community throughout the United States.

History
Inspired by the Shoah Foundation’s Visual History Archive of interviews with Holocaust witnesses and survivors, documentary TV and film producer Mason Funk established OUTWORDS in 2016. Half-day interviews are conducted on high-definition digital video by film crews, primarily in the homes of interview subjects. Interviewees have included lesbian, gay, bisexual, transgender, and intersex individuals, as well as representatives of various sub-communities of the LGBTQ community including drag queens, leather daddies, lesbian separatists, and allies. Most interviewees are over 70 years old.

In May 2018, OUTWORDS received a Creator Award in the Community Giver category from the co-working company WeWork. In May 2019, HarperCollins published the first compilation of OUTWORDS interviews, entitled The Book of Pride, to commemorate the 50th anniversary of the Stonewall Riots. At the same time, OUTWORDS released a searchable digital platform which makes video interviews and historical photos freely available to the public.

Interviews
As of August 2022, OUTWORDS had recorded 250 interviews with LGBTQIA2S+ elders in 35 states.  Interviewees have included:

Publications
 The Book of Pride: LGBTQ Heroes Who Changed the World, (HarperCollins, May 2019),

See also
 LGBT History
 Mattachine Society
 ONE National Gay & Lesbian Archives
 Lesbian Herstory Archives
 Tretter Archives
 Transgender Oral History Project

References

External links
 

Archives in the United States
LGBT history in California
LGBT museums and archives
LGBT organizations in the United States
LGBT studies organizations
Organizations based in Los Angeles